The Simon Benson House is a  19th-century house located in downtown Portland, Oregon. It was listed on the National Register of Historic Places in 1983.

History
The Queen Anne style house was built of wood-frame construction in 1900. Norwegian immigrant Simon Benson (1851-1942) was a leading businessman, innovator, and philanthropist. Benson helped build Benson Polytechnic High School and gave the  iconic bronze Benson Bubbler  drinking fountains to the City of Portland. He had the house built as a residence for his family. The Benson family moved from the house in 1913  when the Benson Hotel was completed. 

During the 1930s, the house was turned into a boarding house, and then later divided into apartments.
It was moved to its current location at SW Park and Montgomery Street at Portland State University  (PSU) in 2000.
It is currently owned by Portland State University and is the site of the PSU Alumni Association .

See also
 National Register of Historic Places listings in Southwest Portland, Oregon

References

Further reading
Alice Benson Allen (1976) Simon Benson: Northwest Lumber King (Hillsboro, OR: Binford & Mort Publishing)

External links

Floor plans

1900 establishments in Oregon
Houses completed in 1900
Houses on the National Register of Historic Places in Portland, Oregon
Portland State University buildings
Queen Anne architecture in Oregon
Relocated buildings and structures in Oregon
Portland Historic Landmarks